Neranjan Wickramasinghe (6 June 1961 – 12 May 2015) was a Sri Lankan politician, a member of the Parliament of Sri Lanka. He was of the Sri Lanka Freedom Party.

See also
List of political families in Sri Lanka

References

1961 births
2015 deaths
Members of the 14th Parliament of Sri Lanka
Sri Lanka Freedom Party politicians
United People's Freedom Alliance politicians
Sinhalese politicians